The Vélodrome de Bordeaux is a velodrome in Bordeaux, France. It hosted the UCI Track Cycling World Championships in 1998 and 2006. Building started in 1987 and the velodrome was opened on 9 October 1989.

The arena hosts cycling and athletics facilities. For athletics, there is an elliptical four-lane   track, a  sprinting track and areas for jumps and throws. There are seats for 4560 spectators.

External links

Sports venues in Bordeaux
Indoor arenas in France
Velodromes in France
Sports venues completed in 1989